Alex Haddow (born 8 January 1982) is an English footballer who plays as a left sided defender or midfielder. He played in the Football League for Reading and Carlisle United before moving into non-league football following a serious knee injury.

Club career 
Born in Fleet, Haddow began his career in the Academy at Reading. He made his debut on 24 August 1999 against Peterborough United in the League Cup, making a total of three appearances during the 1999–2000 season. He joined Barnet on a one-month loan in July 2000 but did not make any appearances and returned to Reading, though he featured in just one game over the course of the season, a 4–0 win at home to Brentford. He was released by Reading in May 2001 and joined Carlisle United three months later. After five appearances for the club he damaged his cruciate ligament and was ruled out for the rest of the season. He left Carlisle at the end of the season and trialled with Canadian side Vancouver Whitecaps before moving into non-league football.

After short spells at Hartley Wintney and Aldershot Town he joined Isthmian League side Slough Town in August 2003. In two years with club Haddow accumulated 72 appearances in all competitions, scoring twice. He also won the FA Cup Player of the Round award for his performance in Slough's 2–1 first-round win over Walsall in November 2004. In February 2005 he joined divisional rivals Eastleigh on a two-year contract though he did not remain at the club long, joining Salisbury City on loan in September before making the move permanent two months later. He remained with the side until the end of the 2006–07 season, scoring nine goals in more than 70 appearances, but was not offered a new contract upon Salisbury's promotion to the Conference Premier.

He briefly turned out for Hampton & Richmond Borough before joining Bognor Regis Town in late 2007. He remained with the club until the end of the season before financial problems at Bognor saw him move to Horsham where he played until 2010.

International career 
Haddow was called up to the England futsal squad in 2005 and went on to make a number of appearances for the side.

Career statistics (partial)

After football 
Haddow now works as a rehabilitation specialist and part-time university lecturer.

References

External links 
 Alex Haddow profile at Slough Town F.C.
 

1982 births
Living people
People from Fleet, Hampshire
English footballers
English men's futsal players
Association football fullbacks
Association football midfielders
Reading F.C. players
Carlisle United F.C. players
Aldershot Town F.C. players
Slough Town F.C. players
Eastleigh F.C. players
Salisbury City F.C. players
Hampton & Richmond Borough F.C. players
Bognor Regis Town F.C. players
Horsham F.C. players
English Football League players
National League (English football) players
Isthmian League players
Southern Football League players
Hartley Wintney F.C. players